Nia Tsivtsivadze (born 1 September 1994) is a Georgian model and beauty pageant titleholder who was crowned Miss Georgia 2017. She represented Georgia in the Miss World 2018 competition.

References

External links

1994 births
Beauty pageant winners from Georgia (country)
Female models from Georgia (country)
Living people
Miss Georgia (country) winners
Miss World 2018 delegates
Models from Tbilisi